The 1968 Eisenhower Trophy took place 9 to 12 October at the Royal Melbourne Golf Club in Black Rock, Victoria, Australia. It was the sixth World Amateur Team Championship for the Eisenhower Trophy. The tournament was a 72-hole stroke play team event with 26 four-man teams. The best three scores for each round counted towards the team total.

The United States won the Eisenhower Trophy for the third time, finishing a strokes ahead of the silver medalists, Great Britain and Ireland. Canada took the bronze medal while Australia finished fourth. Michael Bonallack and Vinny Giles had the lowest individual scores, six-under-par 286.

Great Britain and Ireland led by 7 strokes after three rounds but the Americans scored 73, 73 and 75 in the final round to Great Britain and Irelands 76, 76, and 77 to win by a stroke. At the last hole, Ronnie Shade missed a 6-foot putt, after which Dick Siderowf holed from 3 feet to give the United States the victory.

Teams
26 teams contested the event. Each team had four players with the exception of Venuezela who were represented by only three players.

Scores

Source:

Individual leaders
There was no official recognition for the lowest individual scores.

Source:

References

External links
World Amateur Team Championships on International Golf Federation website

Eisenhower Trophy
Golf tournaments in Australia
Eisenhower Trophy
Eisenhower Trophy
Eisenhower Trophy